Thiersheim is a municipality  in the district of Wunsiedel in Bavaria in Germany.

Grafenreuth, now a part of Thiersheim, was the seat of the noble family Gravenreuth for centuries.

References

Wunsiedel (district)